Jeremiah Jordan Rivers (born July 27, 1987) is an American former professional basketball player. He played college basketball at Georgetown University, before transferring to Indiana University. He previously attended Winter Park High School in Florida. He is the son of former NBA player and current Philadelphia 76ers head coach Doc Rivers, and the older brother of current NBA player Austin Rivers.

Pro career
Upon college graduation, Rivers signed with Mega Vizura from Serbia in August 2011. However, Rivers injured his ankle in January 2012, and missed the rest of the 2011–12 season. He played 14 games, averaging 6.2 points per game.

After recovering from double ankle surgery, Rivers participated in the 2012 Las Vegas NBA Summer League, averaging 3.5 points and 1.8 rebounds in four games with the New York Knicks.

Personal life
Rivers is the oldest son of Philadelphia 76ers head coach Doc Rivers and Kristen Rivers (née Campion). His younger sister Callie played volleyball for the University of Florida and is married to NBA player Seth Curry. His younger brother Austin currently plays for the Minnesota Timberwolves, and his youngest brother, Spencer played for UC Irvine.

References

External links
 Jeremiah Rivers at GUHoyas.com
 Jeremiah Rivers at IUHoosiers.com

1987 births
Living people
African-American basketball players
American expatriate basketball people in Serbia
Basketball players from Milwaukee
Georgetown Hoyas men's basketball players
Indiana Hoosiers men's basketball players
KK Mega Basket players
Maine Red Claws players
Point guards
Shooting guards
Winter Park High School alumni
American men's basketball players
21st-century African-American sportspeople
20th-century African-American people